The 2002 Colonial Athletic Association baseball tournament was held at Coy Tillett Sr. Memorial Field in Manteo, North Carolina, from May 21 through 25.  The event determined the champion of the Colonial Athletic Association for the 2002 season.  Sixth-seeded  won the tournament for the first time and earned the CAA's automatic bid to the 2002 NCAA Division I baseball tournament.  For the first time, the conference named an All-Tournament Team rather than simply a Most Outstanding Player.

Entering the event, former member East Carolina had won the most championships, with seven.  Among active members, Old Dominion led with three titles while George Mason had won twice and William & Mary won once.

Format and seeding
The CAA's two division winners received the top two seeds and a first round bye, as determined by division record.  James Madison and William & Mary both finished with 9–3 records in their divisions.  The next four teams, regardless of division, were selected and seeded by conference winning percentage.  They played a double-elimination tournament.  This resulted in William & Mary receiving a higher seed than three teams in their own division who finished with higher conference winning percentages.

Bracket and results

All-Tournament Team
The following players were named to the All-Tournament Team.

Most Valuable Player
Brian Marshall was named Tournament Most Valuable Player.  Marshall was a pitcher for VCU.

References

Tournament
Colonial Athletic Association Baseball Tournament
Colonial Athletic Association baseball tournament
Colonial Athletic Association baseball tournament
Baseball in North Carolina
College sports in North Carolina
Sports competitions in North Carolina
Tourist attractions in Dare County, North Carolina